The Atlantic Bubble was a special travel-restricted area created on July 3, 2020, during the COVID-19 pandemic in Canada. The area was an agreement between the four Atlantic Canadian provinces of New Brunswick, Prince Edward Island, Nova Scotia, and Newfoundland and Labrador which allowed unrestricted travel among provincial residents and restricts travel from Canadians who are residents of outside provinces. Residents wishing to travel to the Atlantic Bubble are subjected to screening and are required to quarantine for 14 days before moving freely throughout the bubble. Individual provinces have specific rules toward travellers from outside of Atlantic Canada. The provinces in the bubble have seen the lowest numbers of COVID-19 compared to other Canadian provinces throughout the pandemic.

The area was suspended on November 26, 2020, due to a second wave of COVID-19 cases across Canada. The Council of Atlantic Premiers confirmed the bubble would resume April 19, 2021, but later postponed the date to May 3, 2021, due to an increase in cases due to the third wave of the virus. Following a travel ban on outside travellers in PEI and Nova Scotia, the reopening date was postponed indefinitely. In late May 2021, plans for the reopening of the bubble were announced by some of the provinces, with various possible reopening dates. However, each province has their own reopening plans which include allowing travel from outside the Atlantic region and no consensus has been made between the four provinces, leaving the fate of the bubble unclear.

Following mass-vaccinations across the country, the Atlantic Bubble had a reiteration in June 2021. Free travel is allowed between the provinces generally speaking, with the exception of Prince Edward Island, who require at least partial vaccination (one-dose) to enter the province. Each province has their own rules on outside travellers from other provinces in Canada - fully vaccinated travellers (both-doses) are allowed to enter each province freely without quarantine.

History
The Atlantic Bubble was first conceived to encourage economic strength and fluidity amongst the Atlantic provinces due to the economic impact of the COVID-19 pandemic in Canada. Initially, the Atlantic Provinces had interprovincial travel restrictions, to prevent the spread of COVID-19. On June 24, 2020, it was announced that the four premiers of the Atlantic Canadian provinces had come to an agreement of creating a free-travel bubble, effective July 3, 2020 amongst the provinces.

On November 23, Newfoundland and Labrador and Prince Edward Island announced plans to suspend involvement in the bubble effective November 24. Travellers from other Atlantic provinces would be required to self-isolate upon entry, thus restricting the bubble to just New Brunswick and Nova Scotia. On November 26, New Brunswick joined PEI and Newfoundland and Labrador in imposing a 14-day self-isolation requirement on out-of-province travellers, thus ending any free-travel amongst the member provinces. On December 3, Prince Edward Island extended its suspension of involvement in the bubble.

In response, Nova Scotian Premier Stephen McNeil commented that despite the temporary withdrawal of other provinces from the agreement, he called the bubble concept a success for Atlantic Canadians' mental health during the COVID-19 pandemic. Nova Scotians do not have to self-isolate if they return from another Atlantic province, but will face regional self-isolation orders if entering one of the other three provinces.

Premier Furey of Newfoundland and Labrador announced December 7 that the province will suspend involvement in the bubble until at least the beginning of 2021. PEI will be suspending its involvement in the bubble until at least January 11, 2021.

On January 4, 2021, Dr. Jennifer Russell of New Brunswick suggested talks of restarting the bubble will likely resume shortly.

On January 9, 2021, due to a spike in cases in New Brunswick, Nova Scotia officially restricted travel from New Brunswickers travelling into the province, requiring a 14-day self isolation (with work and medical exemptions).

On February 10, 2021, similar circumstances in Newfoundland and Labrador prompted Nova Scotia to restrict travel from that province as well, leaving the final remnant of the original Atlantic bubble in place only for travel from Prince Edward Island into Nova Scotia.

Dependant on COVID-19 cases, PEI's Chief Health Office Dr. Heather Morrison hopes the bubble could reopen around April 1, 2021.

On March 18, 2021, the Council of Atlantic Premiers confirmed the bubble would resume April 19, 2021.

On March 19, 2021, Nova Scotia opened their border with New Brunswick, allowing New Brunswick and PEI residents to freely travel to the province without having to self-isolate.

On April 13, 2021, the Bubble's reopening was delayed until May 3, 2021, due to a resurgence of cases.

During this period, the French territory of Saint Pierre and Miquelon requested to be part of the bubble, although this was unsuccessful.

Following a travel ban on outside travellers by PEI and Nova Scotia, the reopening date of the bubble has been postponed indefinitely once again. Nova Scotia Premier Rankin saying that the bubble was "clearly not going to happen".

On May 27, 2021, PEI announced reopening plans for the province and the plan stated that on June 27, 2021, Atlantic Canadians with one dose of vaccine would be allowed travel freely without a need for a 14-day isolation. However, later that day Premier Blaine Higgs of New Brunswick announced that the bubble would fully reopen on July 1, 2021, to all Atlantic Canadians vaccinated or not. In addition, PEI would open to all travellers from outside Atlantic Canada who are fully vaccinated without the need for self-isolation on August 8, 2021.

Newfoundland and Labrador suspended their part in the Atlantic Bubble on September 30, 2021, due to an increase in cases in the Atlantic Region, as well as their own change in epidemiology. Health officials also announced new travel restrictions for those with one dose of a Health Canada approved COVID-19 vaccine. Partially vaccinated travellers will have the same restrictions as unvaccinated travellers, and will have to isolate for two weeks. However, those who are partially vaccinated may request to be tested for COVID-19 on days 7 through 9 of their isolation.

Rules

At the beginning of the pandemic, peace officers restricted movement between provinces in the Atlantic region. After the agreement to begin the bubble, officers stayed on the border and checked identification for those travelling between provinces. Residents of each of the four provinces are allowed to travel freely amongst member provinces. Travellers from outside of the member provinces are asked to provide proof of plans to quarantine for 14 days. They are also screened for COVID-19 symptoms. New Brunswick, which borders Quebec is the only province with a land border to restrict vehicular traffic. Each province has different rules for entering the province for travellers from outside the Atlantic Bubble. Air travellers are screened for COVID-19 and asked for proof of plans to quarantine for 14 days.

Prince Edward Island
Prince Edward Island has more stringent restrictions than the other provinces and requires advance written approval from the government for travellers from outside of the Atlantic Bubble. The island province has established the PEI Pass which requires travellers from outside the province to apply for a special travel visa to enter the province. Travellers from outside Atlantic Canada must be fully vaccinated with a Health Canada approved vaccine in order to be exempt from quarantine. Travellers are still tested upon entry to the province.

Incidents

2020 
July 6: A truck driver in Georgetown, Prince Edward Island was fined for failing to self isolate after travelling outside of the Atlantic Bubble.
September 4–7: Four students were fined by RCMP in Antigonish and Wolfville in Nova Scotia for failure to self-isolate.
September 10: A student was fined in Wolfville, Nova Scotia for breaking quarantine.
September 21: A man from North Rustico, PEI was fined for failure to self-isolate.
October 1: A man who travelled from Central Africa died from COVID-19 while in self-isolation in Newfoundland and Labrador. The man was asymptomatic while travelling from Central Africa to Toronto, and then Toronto to Halifax and Halifax to Deer Lake on September 30.
October 23: A man from Kentville, Nova Scotia was fined for failing to self isolate after travelling outside the Atlantic Bubble.
November 2: WestJet suspended all flights to the Atlantic provinces, citing lack of interest, due in part to the member province's disinterest in travel outside of the bubble.
December 8: Air Canada announced the suspension of many domestic flights in the Atlantic Canada region effective January 11, 2021, citing lack of interest due to government enforced self-isolation times.

2021 
 April 20: Five people from Ontario were charged in Summerside, PEI for failing to self-isolate after their vehicle was spotted at a Wal-Mart less than one hour after they entered the province.
 May 19: An Ontario man attempting to travel illegally to Newfoundland was arrested for drunk driving in Cape Breton, Nova Scotia.

Reception

A poll found 81% of Atlantic Canadians in favour of the Atlantic Bubble.

Criticism
Critics call into question the constitutionality of the Atlantic Bubble. According to Section 6 of the Canadian Charter of Rights and Freedoms:

Therefore, detractors of the bubble suggest that the concept of the bubble impedes the rights of Canadian citizens and permanent residents.

In September 2020, the Supreme Court of Newfoundland and Labrador ruled that, while existing travel restrictions do violate Section 6 of the Charter, the violation is permitted under Section 1, which allows "limits [on Charter rights]... as can be demonstrably justified in a free and democratic society." The Canadian Civil Liberties Association is appealing the decision.

In May 2021, the Canadian Civil Liberties Association once again challenged travel restrictions, but this time in Nova Scotia. The association claimed unconstitutionality as the travel restrictions interfere with 'travel freedom' in the Canadian Charter of Rights and Freedoms.

See also
COVID-19 pandemic in New Brunswick
COVID-19 pandemic in Prince Edward Island
COVID-19 pandemic in Nova Scotia
COVID-19 pandemic in Newfoundland and Labrador
Baltic Bubble
Zero-COVID

References	

COVID-19 pandemic in Canada
2020 disasters in Canada
2020 in New Brunswick
2020 in Newfoundland and Labrador
2020 in Prince Edward Island
2020 in Nova Scotia
2020 establishments in Canada
Containment efforts related to the COVID-19 pandemic